is a former Japanese politician of the now defunct People's New Party and was a member of the House of Representatives in the Diet (national legislature). A native of Kanoashi District, Shimane and graduate of Gakushuin University, he ran unsuccessfully for the House of Representatives in 1971 as an independent. He ran again three years later as a member of the Liberal Democratic Party and was elected for the first time.

His daughter Akiko Kamei is also a politician.

References

External links 
 Official website in Japanese.
 

1939 births
Living people
21st-century Japanese politicians
Gakushuin University alumni
Government ministers of Japan
Liberal Democratic Party (Japan) politicians
Members of the House of Councillors (Japan)
Members of the House of Representatives (Japan)
People from Shimane Prefecture
People from Tokyo
People's New Party politicians